Highway 105 (AR 105, Ark. 105, and Hwy. 105) is a north–south state highway in Pope County, Arkansas. The route of  runs from Galla Creek Wildlife Management Area north across Interstate 40 (I-40) and U.S. Route 64 (US 64) to Highway 27 near Hector.

Route description

The route begins in southern Pope County at Galla Creek Wildlife Management Area and runs north through Atkins. The highway has a brief concurrency with US 64 west through Atkins beginning near the Missouri Pacific Depot on the National Register of Historic Places. Highway 105 turns north and runs along the Atkins Commercial Historic District before an interchange with I-40. The route serves as the eastern terminus of Highway 363 north of I-40 and the western terminus of Highway 247 further north. The highway continues to wind north to serve as the eastern terminus of Highway 164 before an overlap with Highway 124. Highway 105 terminates just south of Hector at Highway 27.

Major intersections

|-
| align=center colspan=4 |  concurrency west, 
|-

See also

 List of state highways in Arkansas

References

External links

105
Transportation in Pope County, Arkansas